Seal Rock is an unincorporated coastal community in Lincoln County, Oregon, United States, between Newport and Waldport on U.S. Route 101.

In Chinook Jargon the area was called Seal Illahe, meaning "seal place" or "seal home", while "Seal Rocks" is what the locality was called in pioneer times, when it was an early resort community.

Seal Rock was the terminus of the Corvallis & Yaquina Bay Wagon Road, which was the first road to reach the Oregon Coast from the Willamette Valley. The town of Seal Rock was platted in 1887 and three blocks of hotels were built, but development lagged and the assets of the road company were transferred to the promoter of the Oregon Pacific Railway, T. Egenton Hogg. Seal Rock post office was established in 1890.

Seal Rock is also the name of an address-restricted archaeological site in the vicinity that is listed on the National Register of Historic Places.

References

External links
 History of Seal Rock from sealrock.or.com
 Oregon Coastal Atlas: Seal Rock Rocky Shore Management Cell
 Seal Rock State Recreation Site from Oregon Parks and Recreation Department

1887 establishments in Oregon
Oregon Coast
Populated coastal places in Oregon
Populated places established in 1887
Unincorporated communities in Lincoln County, Oregon